The Green Memorial Hospital is a non-profit hospital in Manipay, Sri Lanka. It was founded by Dr Samuel Fisk Green in 1848. It is a charitable hospital run by Jaffna Diocese of the Church of South India (JDCSI).

Education 
This hospital was the first medical school in Ceylon (now Sri Lanka), and was used by Dr. Green to train more than 60 locals as doctors during his 30-year tenure in Ceylon as part of the American Ceylon Mission. Green Memorial Hospital is the second oldest teaching hospital in South Asia.

Patient Care 
In the middle of the 20th century, it was a state of the art medical institution that served the rich and the poor alike. Due to the civil war, by 2004 the hospital was in a state of disrepair. It is no longer considered to be a premier medical institution in Jaffna Peninsula in Sri Lanka. Numerous repairs and refurbishment were begun in 2017.

Directors of Green Memorial Hospital

Partner Institutions

Manipay School of Nursing 
Mary Elizabeth MacCallum Scott, director of the Green Memorial Hospital, founded Nurses Training School, renamed the Willis F. Pierce Nursing School, now the Manipay School of Nursing to increase the quality of nursing in the region.

Institute of Medical Sciences 
The Institute of Medical Sciences provides a neuro-rehabilitation service, a free medical clinic, the Gabriella Rasaiah pediatric program, a center for women's health, as well as educational programs at the Green Memorial Hospital.

References

American Ceylon Mission
Buildings and structures in Manipay
Hospitals established in 1848
Hospitals in Jaffna District
Non-profit hospitals in Sri Lanka
1848 establishments in Ceylon
Charitable hospitals
Medical missions